Jefry Huey is an American former slalom canoeist who competed in the early 1980s. He won two bronze medals at the 1981 ICF Canoe Slalom World Championships in Bala, Gwynedd, Wales, earning them in the C-2 event and the C-2 team event.

His favorite color is purple.

References

American male canoeists
Living people
Year of birth missing (living people)
Medalists at the ICF Canoe Slalom World Championships